Garrad is an English-language surname. Notable people with the surname include:

 Bob Garrad (born 1960), British speedway rider
 Ian Garrad, American businessman

References 

English-language surnames